Chiara Natalia Barchiesi Chávez (born 22 December 1996) is a Chilean politician who currently serves as a member of the Chamber of Deputies of her country.

References

External links
 BCN Profile

1996 births
Living people
Chilean people

21st-century Chilean politicians
Pontifical Catholic University of Chile alumni
Republican Party (Chile, 2019) politicians